Jack Maher (born October 28, 1999) is an American professional soccer player who plays for Major League Soccer club Nashville SC.

Career

Early career
Maher played on an amateur contract with United Soccer League side Saint Louis FC during their 2017 season. He committed to play at Indiana University the following year.

Nashville SC 
Maher was signed by MLS as a Generation Adidas in December 2019, making him available in 2020 MLS SuperDraft. Maher was drafted by Nashville with the second overall pick in the SuperDraft on January 9, 2020.

Charlotte Independence (loan) 
On March 6, 2020, Maher joined USL Championship club Charlotte Independence on loan ahead of the 2020 season.

San Diego Loyal (loan) 
On May 28, 2021, Maher joined San Diego Loyal SC on loan for the 2021 season. However, he was recalled by Nashville on June 23, 2021.

References

External links

1999 births
Living people
American soccer players
Saint Louis FC players
Association football defenders
Indiana Hoosiers men's soccer players
Nashville SC players
Nashville SC draft picks
Soccer players from Illinois
Sportspeople from Greater St. Louis
People from St. Clair County, Illinois
USL League Two players
USL Championship players
United States men's youth international soccer players
Major League Soccer players